Daniel Gortler (Hebrew: דניאל גורטלר) is an Israeli pianist and pedagogue.

Education and early life
Born and raised in Israel, Gortler began studying classical music and piano with Naomi Hachohen.
He graduated from the Rubin Music Academy in Tel-Aviv.
He continued his musical studies graduating from the Musikhochschule Hannover, where he studied with Professor Arie Vardi.

Gortler was faculty member of the Buchmann-Mehta School of Music at the Tel-Aviv University until 2011, and was also guest artist in piano studies in the Department of Music and Performing Arts Professions at New York University's Steinhardt School between 2011 and 2013.

Performing career
As a soloist, Gortler has performed with orchestras including the London Philharmonic Orchestra, Bavarian Radio Symphony Orchestra, Israel Philharmonic Orchestra, Berlin Radio Symphony Orchestra and the San Francisco Symphony, working alongside conductors including Zubin Mehta, Christoph Eschenbach, Valery Gergiev and Michael Tilson Thomas.

Gortler has also performed in several festivals including the Montpellier Festival, Lucerne Festival and Israel Festival.
A collaboration with Pinchas Zukerman led to an original video recording of Marc Neikrug's "Through Roses".

Gortler has also performed chamber music with artists including Nikolaj Znaider, Bo Skovhus and Steven Isserlis.

In 2008, Daniel Gortler performed at the Israeli Presidential Conference for Israeli President Shimon Peres and American President George W. Bush along with 10 other Heads of State.

He has given masterclasses at the Manhattan School of Music and the Gumusluk International Music Festival.

Awards
 First place – Bremen International Piano Competition (1991)
 First place – Viña del Mar International Competition (1987)
 Second place – Munich International Piano Competition
 Gina Bachauer International Piano Competition
 Salon De Virtuoso annual award
 Third place – Geneva International Piano Competition

Recordings
Daniel Gortler has recorded several albums with Romeo Records:
 Songs without Words
 Schubert Lieder with Sharon-Rostorf Zamir
Schumann: Symphonic Etudes & Faschingsschwank aus Wien

References

External links
 Daniel Gortler Official Website
Romeo Records Label

20th-century classical composers
Israeli composers
Living people
Israeli classical pianists
Hochschule für Musik, Theater und Medien Hannover alumni
People from Tel Aviv
Academic staff of Tel Aviv University
Year of birth missing (living people)
Male classical composers
Jewish classical pianists
Male classical pianists
21st-century classical pianists
20th-century male musicians
21st-century male musicians